Norman James Kaye (17 January 1927 – 28 May 2007) was an Australian actor and musician.  He was best known for his roles in the films of director Paul Cox.

Early life and education
Kaye was born in Melbourne and won a scholarship to study at Geelong Grammar School. His parents were distant, and both died early, his mother in a psychiatric hospital.

Musician
Kaye's musical abilities were noticed by A. E. Floyd, the organist of St Paul's Cathedral, Melbourne, who gave him free tuition in recognition of his potential as an organist.

Kaye travelled to France to study the organ with Pierre Cochereau at Notre Dame de Paris and he won a Premier Prix for conducting at the Nice Conservatoire.

Caulfield Grammar School
He was the choirmaster and the music teacher at Caulfield Grammar School from 1958 to 1977, during which time he "[laid] the foundation for [the school's] … high reputation on the world of music [and it was his] enthusiasm and constructive knowledge [that] made choral singing and the playing of orchestral instruments activities of a central rather than peripheral importance to the school." It was the security of a teacher's salary that allowed Kaye to explore the acting world.

Actor
As an actor, he was strongly associated with the films of Paul Cox, appearing in 16 of them. He had small roles in Cox's Illuminations (1976) and Kostas (1979), and shared the lead with Wendy Hughes in Cox's 1982 film Lonely Hearts and the lead in Man of Flowers (1983), for which he won an AFI Award. He appeared in minor roles in many subsequent Cox films including Innocence (2000). Other films in which he appeared included Mad Dog Morgan, Turtle Beach, Oscar and Lucinda and Moulin Rouge!.  He also wrote a number of film scores.

Kaye is the subject of Cox's biographical film The Remarkable Mr Kaye (2005), a tribute to their long standing friendship and working relationship.

Illness
Norman Kaye was diagnosed with Alzheimer's disease prior to 1997.  His inability to memorise scripts for the film Innocence led to the end of his collaboration with Paul Cox, as well as the end of his career in 2004.  Kaye was in the advanced stage of the disease at the time of his death in Sydney on 28 May 2007.  He had enjoyed a 35-year relationship with the opera director Elke Neidhardt, and she was at his side at his death.

Legacy
In 2007 a retrospective CD The Remarkable Norman Kaye was issued by Move Records.

Partial filmography

The Secret of Susanna (1961, TV Movie) - Sante
The First Joanna (1961, TV Movie)
Boy Round the Corner (1962, TV Movie) - Shannon
Fury in Petticoats (1962, TV Movie) - Charlies Darwin
You Can't Win 'Em All (1962, TV Movie) - Selasco
The Angry General (1964, TV Movie) - Major Derek Barrington-Hunt
Martha (1964, TV Movie)
The Road (1964, TV Movie) - Sir Timothy Hassall
Wind from the Icy Country (1964, TV Movie) - Ehrbar
Everyman (1964, TV Movie) - Discretion
Six Characters in Search of an Author (1964, TV Movie) - The Father
The Journey (1972)
Illuminations (1976) - Gabi's Father
Mad Dog Morgan (1976) - Swagman
Inside Looking Out (1978) - Alex
Kostas (1979) - Passenger
The Killing of Angel Street (1981) - Mander
A Dangerous Summer (1982) - Percy Farley
Lonely Hearts (1982) - Peter Thompson
Buddies (1983) - George
Man of Flowers (1983) - Charles
Careful, He Might Hear You (1983) - (uncredited)
Where the Green Ants Dream (1984) - Baldwin Ferguson
Relatives (1984) - Uncle Edward
Unfinished Business (1985) - George
Cactus (1986) - Tom
I Own the Racecourse (1986, TV Movie) - Drunken Old Man
Frenchman's Farm (1987) - Reverend Aldershot
Hungry Heart (1987) - Mr. O'Ryan
Warm Nights on a Slow Moving Train (1987) - Salesman
The Riddle of the Stinson (1988, TV Movie) - Binstead
Boundaries of the Heart (1988) - Billy Marsden
Island (1989) - Henry
Bangkok Hilton (1989, TV Mini Series) - George McNair (uncredited)
Golden Braid (1990) - Psychiatrist
A Woman's Tale (1991) - Billy
Turtle Beach (1992) - Hobday
The Nun and the Bandit (1992) - George Shanley
The Nostradamus Kid (1993) - Wedding Pastor
Broken Highway (1993) - Elias Kidd
The Custodian (1993) - Judge
Bad Boy Bubby (1993) - The Scientist
Exile (1994) - Ghost Priest
Lust and Revenge (1996) - Baba Charles
Heaven's Burning (1997) - Store Owner
Paws (1997) - Alex
Oscar and Lucinda (1997) - Bishop Dancer
Innocence (2000) - Gerald
Moulin Rouge! (2001) - Satine's Doctor
Human Touch (2004) - Charles (final film role)

Awards and nominations
1983 AFI Award: Best Actor in a Lead Role (Man of Flowers)
1982 Nominated for AFI Award: Best Actor in a Lead Role (Lonely Hearts)

See also
 List of Caulfield Grammar School people

Footnotes

References

External links
 
 Obituary in The Age, 31 May 2007, by Fabian Muir, Elke Neidhardt's son whom Norman Kaye helped to raise.
 Muir, Fabian. "Norman Kaye, Artist and Composer", Move Records, Obituary as reproduced from The Age and The Sydney Morning Herald, 1 June 2007.
 Portrait of Norman Kaye (1989), Photographer Angela Lynkushka, Collection of the National Library of Australia.

1927 births
2007 deaths
People educated at Geelong Grammar School
Australian male film actors
Best Actor AACTA Award winners
Australian classical organists
Male classical organists
Australian conductors (music)
Deaths from dementia in Australia
Deaths from Alzheimer's disease
20th-century organists
20th-century conductors (music)
20th-century Australian male musicians
Musicians from Melbourne